The Tijuana Embajadores were a proposed independent professional team to be based out of Tijuana, Baja California, Mexico.  They were to play in the North American League and were expected to play at Estadio de Béisbol Calimax in 2011.  They were to have replaced the Tijuana Cimarrones of the now-defunct Golden Baseball League, which is now a part of the NAL's Western Division along with the Calgary Vipers, Chico Outlaws, Edmonton Capitals, Na Koa Ikaika Maui and Yuma Scorpions.

This was the fourth attempt by the GBL/NAL to bring a permanent professional team to Tijuana, but due to the ongoing political structure, Mexican Drug Wars and safety concerns, they were eventually dropped from NAL plans and replaced by the Henderson RoadRunners.  The Tijuana Toros and Tijuana Potros never played and the Tijuana Cimarrones folded after one season.

References

External links
 North American League official website

Baseball teams in Mexico
Sports teams in Tijuana